Pandanus gabonensis is a species of plant in the family Pandanaceae. It is endemic to Gabon.

References

Flora of Gabon
gabonensis
Vulnerable plants
Endemic flora of Gabon
Taxonomy articles created by Polbot
Plants described in 1986